Walkers Point is a rural locality in the Fraser Coast Region, Queensland, Australia.

Geography
The Mary River forms the western, northern, and most of the eastern boundaries.

References 

Fraser Coast Region
Localities in Queensland